Rikard Bergh and Per Henricsson were the defending champions but did not compete that year.

Claudio Panatta and Tomáš Šmíd won in the final 6–3, 6–2 against Gustavo Giussani and Gerardo Mirad.

Seeds

  Claudio Panatta /  Tomáš Šmíd (champions)
  Josef Čihák /  Christian Miniussi (quarterfinals)
  Martin Sinner /  Michael Stich (semifinals)
  Massimo Cierro /  Alessandro de Minicis (quarterfinals)

Draw

External links
 1989 Athens Open Men's Doubles Draw

Athens doubles
ATP Athens Open